This is a list of public art in Kensington, a district in the City of Westminster and the Royal Borough of Kensington and Chelsea in London.

City of Westminster

Royal Albert Hall frieze 

The exterior of the Royal Albert Hall (built in 1867–1871 to the designs of Francis Fowke and Henry Young Darracott Scott) is embellished with a mosaic frieze composed of sixteen separate designs by multiple artists. This was assembled from 800 slabs prepared by attendees of the South Kensington Museum's mosaic class; the terracotta was manufactured by Minton, Hollins and Company. The designs are listed below in anti-clockwise order from the north.

Royal Geographical Society

Royal Borough of Kensington and Chelsea

North Kensington and Notting Hill

South Kensington

Victoria and Albert Museum

See also
 List of public art in Kensington Gardens

References

Bibliography

 

 

 

Kensington